Ethlyne Clair (born Ethlyne Williamson, November 23, 1904 – February 27, 1996) was an American actress.

Clair was born in Talladega, Alabama. A former New York art student, she appeared mostly in silent film, including three Westerns where she played the love interest to Hoot Gibson. She was succeeded by Derelys Perdue in the Newlyweds film series, in which she appeared in 1927 and 1928. She appeared in the serials The Vanishing Rider (1928) and Queen of the Northwoods (1929). She was a WAMPAS Baby Star in 1929.

Clair was married to Richard Lansdale Hanshaw, an agent and producer; Ern Westmore, a studio makeup artist; and Merle Arthur Frost Jr, an automobile dealer.

On February 27, 1996, Clair died of respiratory failure after ulcer surgery in Tarzana Hospital in Los Angeles at age 91.

Selected filmography
Sandra (1924)
Chickie (1925)
The Hero on Horseback (1927)
Riding for Fame (1928)
 Wild Blood (1928)
Hey Rube! (1928)
From Headquarters (1929)
 The Pride of Pawnee (1929)

References

External links

American film actresses
American silent film actresses
People from Talladega, Alabama
1904 births
1996 deaths
20th-century American actresses
Burials at Forest Lawn Memorial Park (Hollywood Hills)
Actresses from Alabama
WAMPAS Baby Stars
Film serial actresses
Western (genre) film actresses